Elektra and Wolverine: The Redeemer is a trilogy of graphic novels written by Greg Rucka, illustrated by Yoshitaka Amano and published by American company Marvel Comics. It was also released as a Hardcover version with all three episodes in one book. It is canon with Earth-616 continuity as implied in The Classic Marvel Figurine Collection #17 and the events took place soon after Elektra's first death.

Synopsis 
The story opens shortly (apparently) after Wolverine gains his adamantium claws, and also involves established Marvel character Elektra. Elektra must kill the only witness to her last assassination, the victim's daughter, Avery, whom Wolverine has been hired to protect, by someone involved with his past, Dr. Connor. Elektra kidnaps Avery after critically wounding Wolverine, who then pursues Elektra, while Avery and the assassin bond. Wolverine is used by Keifer, another man with ties to his past, and is then ordered to kill Elektra. Avery is revealed to be a mutant, and after several revealing scenes and fights, Avery and Connor are given fake ID's and money to move on with new identities, leaving Logan and Elektra to go on future adventures, albeit separately.

See also
 Wolverine/Nick Fury: The Scorpio Connection
 2002 in comics

References

External links
Hardcover version on Marvel's official website.

Superhero graphic novels
Marvel Comics graphic novels
Wolverine (comics) titles
Comics by Greg Rucka